Asiimwe Evarlyne Buregyeya (born 28 August 1975) is a Ugandan politician, major Captain and a psychologist. She is also a member of  the Parliament of Uganda of the 10th Parliament representing  the Uganda People's Defence Force representative.

Education background 
She attended her Primary Leaving Examinations from Nyamwegabira Primary School in 1987. In 1991, she completed her Uganda Certificate of Education from Kihihi High School. She later attained her Uganda Advanced Certificate of Education in 1994. In 1996, she completed her Diploma of Education from National Teachers College, Kabale. She accomplished her Bachelors Degree in Education from Ndejje University in 2006.  In 2011, she went back to the university to complete Master of Counselling and Psychology from Kampala International University. In 2015, she got a Diploma in Health Systems Management from Galilee Institute, Israel.

Career and political life 
In June 2020 she was appointed director of the UPDG directorate of HIV&AIDS. She had previously served as the deputy dictator of the directorate from 2015 to June 2020, and as deputy director of the HIV Prevention programs Coordination between 2012 and 2015. In 2008-2009, she was employed as the Directing staff at Uganda Military Academy Kabamba. From 2001-2006, she was a teacher at Bombo Military Secondary School and from 1997-2000, she also taught at  Kihihi High School, kihihi teachers college, St Pius secondary school. From 2016 to date, she is the Member of Parliament at the Parliament of Uganda.

In May 2016, she took the oath at the Parliament of Uganda as the UPDF representative Member of Parliament. She was one of the Members of Parliament who voted yes to the passing of the bill to lift the constitutional age limit of 75 years for presidential candidates.

Additional role 
Asiimwe serves on additional role at the Parliament of Uganda as the committee on HIV/AIDS and related disease and committee on  Gender Labour and Social Development.

Personal life 
She is married.

See  also 

 List of members of the tenth Parliament of Uganda
 Parliament of Uganda
 Uganda People's Defence Force
 Katumba Wamala

References 

Living people
1975 births
Women members of the Parliament of Uganda
Ndejje University alumni
Kampala International University alumni
People from Western Region, Uganda
Members of the Parliament of Uganda
Military of Uganda
Ugandan military personnel
Uganda People's Defence Force
21st-century Ugandan politicians
21st-century Ugandan women politicians